Between You and Me is the fourth studio album by the Australian indie rock band San Cisco. It was released on 4 September 2020 and debuted at #3 on the ARIA Albums Chart.

Track listing

Personnel
Adapted from the album's  liner notes.

Musicians
San Cisco
 Jordi Davieson – lead vocals , backing vocals , organ & glockenspiel , acoustic guitar 
 Josh Biondillo – guitar, bass, piano, synthesizer, organ, acoustic guitar 
 Scarlett Stevens – drums & percussion , lead vocals , backing vocals , bass synth 

Other musicians
 Steve Schram – bass , keys , bass synth , guitars 
 James Ireland – keys , percussion 
 Mitchell Benson - bass 
 Jennifer Aslett - backing vocals

Technical

 San Cisco - production, engineering
 Steven Schram - production , mixing , engineering
 James Ireland - mixing , production , engineering 
 Broderick Madden-Scott - mixing, engineering 
 Chris Coady - mixing 
 Adam Ayan - mastering 
 Toni Wilkinson - photography
 Pooneh Ghana - photography
 Jeffrey Annert - artwork & design

Charts

References

2020 albums
San Cisco albums
Albums produced by James Ireland (musician)